Umuoba Anam is one of the villages of Anam (town) located in Anambra East Local Government Area, Anambra State in southeast Nigeria.

Location

Umuoba Anam is one of the three communities that make up Otuocha in Anambra East Local Government Area. The other two communities of Aguleri and Umuleri surround it on the north and south. The Anambra River (Ọnwụbala) borders Umuoba Anam on the west; the western part is called Umuoba Anam III. Aboegbu, Umuoba Anam is located in Anambra West Local Government Area. The Otuocha-Oyeagu Express Road divides Umuoba Anam into two halves. The northern part is known as Okpagba while the southern part is called Akor.

Populated places in Anambra State